NTN is a Ukrainian-language TV broadcaster based in Ukraine. It is a general entertainment channel transmitting daytime programming, sports, and other entertainment programs. It is available as a live stream.

The channel is part of GDF Media Limited, owned by Dmytro Firtash.

Due to the Russian invasion of Ukraine, from February 24 to April 17, 2022, the TV channel broadcast the United News marathon around the clock. There was no advertising on the air. In 2022, Inter Media Group was announced to be launched on new international channel NTN International in May 2022.

References

Television stations in Ukraine
Television channels and stations established in 1996
Ukrainian brands
Ukrainian-language television stations in Ukraine
Russian-language television stations in Ukraine